Bootstrappers may refer to:
Bootstrappers (band), an American band
Bootstrappers (album), their first album